La casa del pelícano ("The House of the Pelican") is a 1976 Mexican thriller film. It was shot in 1976 and released in 1977. Main themes of this film are rape and difficult possessive relationship between mother and her son.

Young Enrique Álvarez Félix played Nilo in this film. This was his most famous film role. Nilo was castrated at the end of the film, and this was interesting for some spectators who noticed that Enrique had a difficult relationship with his mother in his real life.

This film was based on the play Nilo, mi hijo by Antonio González Caballero.

Plot
Elementary school teacher Margarita Ramírez tries to make her life beautiful once again with her son Nilo. He is a result of a rape in a distant city, but Margarita loves him nonetheless.

Nilo, the son of the madman of the city, tries to grow up in a common way, but his mother overprotects him and raise him away from other people.

Cast
 Jacqueline Andere as Margarita Ramírez, a beautiful woman who bore Nilo after she was raped
 Enrique Álvarez Félix as Nilo Ramírez, Margarita's son; he is not free in his life. At the end, he was castrated by his mother.
 Isabela Corona as Clementina
 Rosa Furman as Amelia
 Carlos Agostí – An uncle of Margarita
 Mónica Prado as Aurelia
 Daniela Romo as Engracia – Young and lovely woman
 Marta Zamora as Serafina
 Carlos Romo as Federico
 Federico Falcón as Domingo, Nilo's father
 Carlos Rotzinger
 León Singer
 Roberto Montiel as Honorio, Margarita's fiancé
 Carlos Villarreal
 Patricia Arredondo
 Cecilia Leger as Justina

See also
 Emasculation
 Nilo, mi hijo

References

External links
 
 La Casa del Pelícano

1976 films
1970s thriller drama films
Mexican thriller drama films
1970s Spanish-language films
Castration
Mexican films based on plays
Films set in Mexico
Films shot in Mexico
Films about mental health
1976 drama films
1978 drama films
1978 films
1970s Mexican films